Le cadi dupé (The Duped Qadi, or The Duped Judge) is an opéra comique in one act by Christoph Willibald Gluck. It has a French-language libretto by Pierre-René Lemonnier. It premiered at the Burgtheater in Vienna on 8 December 1761. The libretto had already been set by Pierre-Alexandre Monsigny in an opera that had premiered on 4 February of the same year at the Paris Foire St-Germain.

The music belongs to the Turkish-influenced fashion of the period and features janissary music, represented by piccolo, drums, and cymbals.

Roles

Synopsis

The Cadi has been flirting with other women and neglecting his wife, Fatima.  The mischievous Zelmire, who is in love with Nuradin, tricks the Cadi in order to teach him a lesson.  She pretends to be Omar's daughter, Ali, who is considered less than desirable.  The duped Cadi plans to divorce Fatima in order to marry the pretending Zelmire, but the truth is eventually revealed.

References
Notes

Bibliography
Original Paris libretto: Le Cadi dupé, Opera-comique en un acte par l'Auteur du Maître en Droit, Répresenté pour la premiere fois sur le Théâtre de l'Opera-Comique de la Foire S. Germain, le 4 Fevrier 1761, Paris, Duchesne, 1761 (a copy at books-google)
Bruce Alan Brown, Cadi dupé, Le, in Stanley Sadie (ed.), The New Grove Dictionary of Opera, Grove (Oxford University Press), New York, 1997, I, p. 675,

External links
 Naxos.com
 University of North Texas Libraries

French-language operas
Operas by Christoph Willibald Gluck
Opéras comiques
One-act operas
Operas
1761 operas
Opera world premieres at the Burgtheater